Robert Turner (fl. 1597 – 1601) was an English politician.

He was a Member (MP) of the Parliament of England for Downton in 1597 and for Old Sarum in 1601.

References

16th-century births
17th-century deaths
English MPs 1597–1598
English MPs 1601